East Bolton is a municipality of about 1,000 people, part of the Memphrémagog Regional County Municipality in the Estrie region of Quebec, Canada.

It is the birthplace of Reginald Fessenden, radio pioneer who invented amplitude modulation (AM).

Demographics

Population
Population trend:

Language
Mother tongue (2021)

See also 
 List of municipalities in Quebec
 West Bolton, Quebec

References

External links

Welcome to East Bolton
Official tourist site for Memphremagog

Municipalities in Quebec
Incorporated places in Estrie